I Might Be Wrong: Live Recordings is a live album by the English rock band Radiohead, released on 12 November 2001 in the UK by Parlophone and a day later in the US by Capitol Records. Recorded during Radiohead's 2001 tour, it comprises songs from their fourth and fifth albums Kid A (2000) and Amnesiac (2001). Radiohead rearranged the songs to perform them live. I Might Be Wrong received mainly positive reviews; critics praised the performances and rearrangements, but found the album too short.

Content 
I Might Be Wrong comprises live performances recorded on Radiohead's 2001 tour. It features songs from Kid A (2000) and Amnesiac (2001), plus a solo performance of another song, "True Love Waits", by the singer, Thom Yorke, on acoustic guitar. 

As Radiohead had developed Kid A and Amnesiac through studio experimentation, they rearranged the songs to perform them live. For example, the electronic track "Like Spinning Plates" was rearranged as a piano ballad. The guitarist Ed O'Brien said: "You couldn't do Kid A live and be true to the record. You would have to do it like an art installation ... When we played live, we put the human element back into it." The drummer, Philip Selway, said Radiohead "found some new life" in the songs when they came to perform them.

Reception

At Metacritic, which assigns a normalised rating out of 100 to reviews from critics, I Might Be Wrong has an average score of 76 based on 16 reviews, indicating "generally favourable reviews".

The Entertainment.ie critic Andrew Lynch wrote: "Unlike most live albums, this one captures some of the excitement of actually being there and gives Radiohead back the human dimension they've recently been in danger of losing." Stephen Thompson of The A.V. Club wrote that the album "cast new light" on Kid A and Amnesiac. The Rolling Stone critic Jonah Weiner described it as "explosively raw", praising the "twisty, insular" performance of "Idioteque" and Yorke's "beautifully chilling" vocals on "Like Spinning Plates". Matt LeMay of Pitchfork also praised "Like Spinning Plates", saying it showcased Radiohead's "songwriting virtuosity rather than their sonic adventurousness", and "True Love Waits", which he said was "absolutely gorgeous ... It can hold its own against any song on OK Computer." 

Several critics felt the album was too short. Thompson found it was "marred by characteristically unrevealing packaging and inexplicable brevity". Sam Samuelson of AllMusic suggested it could instead have been packaged with Amnesiac as a "complete Kid A sessions package, rather than a couple of thrown-together releases". LeMay criticised the lack of older Radiohead songs, and said the album had the feeling of a "promotional item" for Kid A and Amnesiac.

Reissues 
Radiohead left EMI after their contract ended in 2003. In 2007, EMI released Radiohead Box Set, a compilation of albums recorded while Radiohead were signed to EMI, including I Might Be Wrong. Radiohead had no input into the reissues and the music was not remastered.

In February 2013, Parlophone was bought by Warner Music Group (WMG). In April 2016, as a result of an agreement with the trade group Impala, WMG transferred Radiohead's back catalogue to XL Recordings. The EMI reissues, released without Radiohead's consent, were removed from streaming services. In May 2016, XL reissued Radiohead's back catalogue on vinyl, including I Might Be Wrong.

Track listing
All songs written by Radiohead except where noted.

Personnel
Adapted from the EP liner notes.

Radiohead 

 Thom Yorke
 Jonny Greenwood
 Ed O'Brien
 Colin Greenwood
 Philip Selway

Production 

 Jim Warren - engineering and mixing (tracks 1, 4, 6, 8)
 Nigel Godrich and Will Shapland - engineering and mixing (tracks 2, 3, 5, 7)

Release history

References

External links

Albums produced by Nigel Godrich
Live EPs
Radiohead EPs
2001 live albums
2001 EPs
Capitol Records live albums
Parlophone live albums
Capitol Records EPs
Parlophone EPs
Radiohead live albums